Galaxy International School is an international school located in Accra, Ghana.

The school has three campuses, a secondary school located in Ashaley Botwe, a primary school and preschool located in East Legon, all in Accra.

History
Galaxy International School was established in 2001 in Accra Ghana to provide day and boarding facilities to children living in Ghana and children of foreigners based and living outside Ghana.
The school currently has 450 students from over 47 countries in attendance.

References 

Schools in Accra
Educational institutions established in 2001
International schools in Ghana
2001 establishments in Ghana